Pipes & Flowers is the debut album by Italian singer Elisa, released in Italy in 1997 by Sugar Records. It followed the single "Sleeping in Your Hand".
In 1998 the album was re-released with the bonus track Cure Me.
Other three official singles, "Labyrinth", "Mr. Want" and "Cure Me" were released, while "A Feast For Me" was released as promo single.

Track listing

Personnel
Steve Smith - drums
Benny Rietveld - bass
Corrado Rustici - guitar, keyboards
Technical
Tracks 1-11: Corrado Rustici - Producer, Matt Rohr - Mixing
Track 12 : Darren Allison - Producer, Mixing
Brian Lane: mastering

Certifications

References

1997 albums
Elisa (Italian singer) albums